Burd Ellen and Young Tamlane is Child ballad number 28.

Despite similarity in names, it appears to have no connection with Tam Lin, nor with the tale of Childe Rowland, though they both have characters named Burd Ellen; indeed, Francis James Child was unable to connect this ballad with any other tradition or ballad.

The ballad is quite probably fragmentary in its current form.

Synopsis
Burd Ellen is weeping.  Young Tamlane tells her to rock her son.  She tells him to rock the child himself, she has done more than her share.  Instead, he goes to sea, with her curse.

Lyrics

See also
List of the Child Ballads

References

External links
Burd Ellen and Young Tamlane with commentary

Child Ballads
Year of song unknown
Songwriter unknown